Flight 845 may refer to

Pan Am Flight 845, crashed on 30 July 1971
Pan Am Flight 845/26, ditched on 26 March 1955

0845